"Errantry" is a three-page poem by J.R.R. Tolkien, first published in The Oxford Magazine in 1933. It was included in revised and extended form in Tolkien's 1962 collection of short poems, The Adventures of Tom Bombadil. Donald Swann set the poem to music in his 1967 song cycle, The Road Goes Ever On.

The poem has a complex metre, invented by Tolkien. It fits the tune of Gilbert and Sullivan's patter song, "I Am the Very Model of a Modern Major-General". It shares metre and rhyming patterns with the "Song of Eärendil", a poem entirely different in tone. The scholar Paul H. Kocher calls the pair "obviously designed for contrast".

The Tolkien scholar Randel Helms calls it "a stunningly skillful piece of versification... with smooth and lovely rhythms". Tolkien described it as "the most attractive" of his poems.

Poem

Subject 

The J. R. R. Tolkien Encyclopedia describes "Errantry" as "the nonsensical adventures of a tiny messenger knight who falls in love with a butterfly and battles various insects." It adds that it is then linked to the Hobbit Bilbo Baggins's "serious account of Eärendil's quest" as described in Tolkien's 1954–55 novel The Lord of the Rings. 

The poem mentions creatures called Dumbledors and Hummerhorns. "Dumbledor" is an English dialect word for bumblebee, while according to the Tolkien scholars Christina Scull & Wayne G. Hammond, "Hummerhorn" is apparently a name invented by Tolkien for a large wasp or hornet.

Metre

Tolkien invented the metre, which consists of trisyllabic assonances, three in each set of four lines. The second and fourth line in every quatrain rhyme, as do the end of the first line and beginning of the second line in every pair. He found this so difficult that he never wrote another poem in this style, though he did later develop another style from this, and the result, through long evolution from Errantry, was Eärendil the Mariner, published in The Fellowship of the Ring.

Joe R. Christopher, in the J. R. R. Tolkien Encyclopedia, writes that the poem could be seen conventionally as quatrains of iambic tetrameters with ABCB rhyme, but that the recording of Tolkien reading the poem shows the metre to be his own invention. In Christopher's analysis, each line is composed of "two second-class paeons", each consisting of an iamb and a pyrrhus: ˘ − ˘ ˘. There is an additional rhyme or half-rhyme of the ends of the A or C lines with the first paeon of the B lines.

Catherine McIlwaine, director of an exhibition of Tolkien's works, called the poem "a new metrical experiment", noting that Tolkien read it to The Inklings, C. S. Lewis's literary group at Oxford.

Middle-earth framework

For The Adventures of Tom Bombadil, Tolkien needed to find a way to incorporate the poem into the framework of The Lord of the Rings. The scholar Tom Shippey states that he achieved this "with great finesse" with the explanation that "Errantry" was an early work by the Hobbit Bilbo Baggins, composed soon after his return from the journey described in The Hobbit, so that he knew a little about Elves, but before he had moved to Rivendell where he actually studied Elvish languages properly. Accordingly, the work is sometimes classed as a Hobbit poem.

Setting

The composer and entertainer Donald Swann set the poem to music. The sheet music and an audio recording are part of his 1967 song cycle, The Road Goes Ever On.

The J. R. R. Tolkien Encyclopedia states that the poem was "evidently" inspired by Gilbert and Sullivan's patter song "I Am the Very Model of a Modern Major-General", whose tune it fits, and further that Swann's musical setting is an obvious pastiche of Sullivan's style.

Analysis

The scholar of English Randel Helms described "Errantry" as "a stunningly skillful piece of versification... with smooth and lovely rhythms". The Scottish poet Alan Bold, who, Melanie Rawls notes, disliked almost all of Tolkien's verse, dismissed Helm's praise, writing that the poem "certainly displays all the sentimental silliness of the early Tolkien with its relentlessly contrived internal rhyming".

Shippey comments that the subject matter of tiny fairies was exactly what, later in his career, Tolkien came to abhor, emphasising instead the energy and strength of Elves and Dwarves. He suggests that Tolkien may have been especially proud of the poem's complex metre, and so chose to rework and extend the poem for the 1962 book. Tolkien indeed called it "the most attractive" of his poems in a 1952 letter to his publisher, Rayner Unwin, adding that 

Paul H. Kocher writes that "Errantry" and the "Song of Eärendil" are "obviously designed for contrast", as if Tolkien had set himself the challenge of using the same theme of endless wandering, the same metrical forms and the same rhyming schemes, it would be possible to create both a tragedy and an "airy jest": "Looking at the passages picturing the armour of the two heroes we can see both the similarity in structure and the polarity in tone".

References

Primary
This list identifies each item's location in Tolkien's writings.

Secondary

1933 poems
British poems
Middle-earth poetry
Middle-earth music

fr:Les Aventures de Tom Bombadil#Errance